Pilsbury is a hamlet in the English county of Derbyshire, approximately 2 miles north of Hartington. It is on the side of the valley of the River Dove that, thereabouts, forms the border with the county of Staffordshire.

History
Pilsbury was mentioned in the Domesday book as belonging to Henry de Ferrers and being worth ten shillings. Just to the north of the hamlet is the site of Henry de Ferrers' Pilsbury Castle.

References

Hamlets in Derbyshire
Towns and villages of the Peak District
Derbyshire Dales